Barbara Bryne (born 1 April 1929) is a British-American actress of film, theatre and television. Onstage she has appeared in comedy, dramatic and musical production of Broadway and studied at the Royal Academy of Dramatic Arts (RADA).

Career
Bryne came to Canada in the early 1960s and has been a frequent performer at the Stratford Shakespeare Festival since 1966 and at the Guthrie Theater (Minneapolis) for 50 years. In 1982, she was nominated for a Drama Desk Award as Outstanding Actress in a Drama for her role as "Kath" in the first American production of Joe Orton's Entertaining Mr. Sloane (which starred Maxwell Caulfield in the title role).

She was in the original Broadway productions of Stephen Sondheim's Sunday in the Park with George (as George's mother) and Into The Woods (as Jack's mother). She also performed in Sondheim's A Little Night Music in Washington, D.C. She was also a frequent performer at Minneapolis' Guthrie Theater. Among the plays in which she appeared there were Mother Courage, The Glass Menagerie, She Stoops to Conquer, Design for Living, and, most recently, Pygmalion.

On television she played "Mrs. Gaffney" on the Tony Randall series, Love, Sidney (1981–83). In 2011 she appeared as Queen Victoria in H.M.S. Pinafore, which was filmed for PBS in late August 2011. Among the films in which she has appeared are: Romeo & Juliet (1993 TV film), Into the Woods (1991 TV film), Two Evil Eyes (1990; "The Black Cat" segment), Sunday in the Park with George (1986 TV film), Amadeus (1984), The Bostonians (1984), and The School for Scandal (1975 TV film).

Stage

Filmography

References

External links
 
 
 
 
 Barbara Bryne profile, theatredb.com; accessed 6 August 2014.

1929 births
Living people
English film actresses
English musical theatre actresses
English stage actresses
English television actresses
English expatriates in the United States
Actresses from London